24th London Film Critics Circle Awards
11 February 2004

Film of the Year: 
 Master and Commander: The Far Side of the World 

British Film of the Year: 
 The Magdalene Sisters 

The 24th London Film Critics Circle Awards, honouring the best in film for 2003, were announced by the London Film Critics Circle on 11 February 2004.

Winners and nominees

Film of the Year
 Master and Commander: The Far Side of the World 
Far from Heaven
The Hours
The Lord of the Rings: The Return of the King
Mystic River

British Film of the Year
 The Magdalene Sisters 
The Hours
In This World
The Mother
Young Adam

Foreign Language Film of the Year
 Good Bye Lenin! • Germany
Spirited Away • Japan
Swimming Pool • France/UK
To Be and to Have • France
The Triplets of Belleville • France

Director of the Year
Clint Eastwood - Mystic River 
Todd Haynes - Far from Heaven
Peter Jackson - The Lord of the Rings: The Return of the King
Andrew Stanton - Finding Nemo
Peter Weir - Master and Commander: The Far Side of the World

British Director of the Year
Peter Mullan - The Magdalene Sisters 
Stephen Daldry - The Hours
David MacKenzie - Young Adam
Anthony Minghella - Cold Mountain
Michael Winterbottom - In This World

Screenwriter of the Year
John Collee and Peter Weir - Master and Commander: The Far Side of the World 
Shari Springer Berman and Robert Pulcini - American Splendor
Charlie Kaufman - Adaptation.
Todd Haynes - Far from Heaven
Brian Helgeland - Mystic River

British Screenwriter of the Year
David Hare - The Hours 
Richard Curtis - Love Actually
Peter Mullan - The Magdalene Sisters
Hanif Kureshi - The Mother
David MacKenzie - Young Adam

Actor of the Year
Sean Penn - Mystic River 
Nicolas Cage - Adaptation.
Russell Crowe - Master and Commander: The Far Side of the World
Ed Harris - The Hours
Bill Murray - Lost in Translation

Actress of the Year
Julianne Moore - Far from Heaven 
Holly Hunter - Thirteen
Scarlett Johansson - Girl with a Pearl Earring
Nicole Kidman - Cold Mountain
Meryl Streep - Adaptation.

British Actor of the Year
Paul Bettany - Master and Commander: The Far Side of the World 
Paddy Considine - In America
Daniel Craig - The Mother
Jude Law - Cold Mountain
Ewan McGregor - Young Adam

British Actress of the Year
Anne Reid - The Mother 
Helen Mirren - Calendar Girls
Charlotte Rampling - Swimming Pool
Tilda Swinton - Young Adam
Julie Walters - Calendar Girls

British Supporting Actor of the Year
Bill Nighy - Love Actually 
John Alderton - Calendar Girls
Stephen Dillane - The Hours
Brendan Gleeson - Cold Mountain
David Threlfall - Master and Commander: The Far Side of the World

British Supporting Actress of the Year
Emma Thompson - Love Actually 
Shirley Henderson - Intermission
Emily Mortimer - Young Adam
Eileen Walsh - The Magdalene Sisters
Fenella Woolgar - Bright Young Things

British Newcomer of the Year
David MacKenzie - Young Adam 
Richard Curtis - Love Actually
Romola Garai - I Capture the Castle
Nora-Jane Noone - The Magdalene Sisters
Jamie Sives - Wilbur Wants to Kill Himself

Dilys Powell Award
Tom Courtenay

External links
 London Critics Circle Film Awards at IMDB

References

2
2003 film awards
2003 in London
2003 in British cinema